Jagdfliegerführer Deutsche Bucht (Fighter Leader German Bight) was one of the primary divisions of the German Luftwaffe in World War II. It was formed in December 1939 at Jever for the defense of the German Bight. On 1 December 1943 the unit redesignated Jagdfliegerführer 2 and subordinated to the 2. Jagddivision. The headquarters was located at Jever and from 1943 in Stade.

Commanding officers

Fliegerführer
Generalmajor Carl-August Schumacher, December 1939 – 31 July 1941
Generalleutnant Werner Junck, 1 August 1941 – 31 March 1942
Generalmajor Hermann Frommherz, 1 April 1942 – 30 September 1942
Oberst Karl Hentschel, 17 August 1942 – 1 October 1943
Oberst Johann Schalk, 1 October 1943 – 1 December 1943

References
Notes

References
 Jagdfliegerführer Deutsche Bucht @ Lexikon der Wehrmacht
 Jagdfliegerführer Deutsche Bucht @ The Luftwaffe, 1933-45

Luftwaffe Fliegerführer
Military units and formations established in 1939
Military units and formations disestablished in 1943